Kevin R. Herget (born April 3, 1991) is an American professional baseball pitcher in the Cincinnati Reds organization. He made his MLB debut with the Tampa Bay Rays in 2022.

Career

St. Louis Cardinals/Cleveland Indians
Born in Teaneck, New Jersey, Herget played prep baseball at Park Ridge High School in Park Ridge, New Jersey. He was drafted out of Kean University by the St. Louis Cardinals in the 39th round of the 2013 Major League Baseball draft. He became a minor league free agent on November 1, 2020, and signed with the Cleveland Indians on a minor-league deal on May 25, 2021.

Tampa Bay Rays
Herget began 2022 with the Charleston Dirty Birds of the Atlantic League of Professional Baseball. On May 11, 2022, the Tampa Bay Rays signed Herget to a minor league deal. With the Durham Bulls, he posted a 2.45 earned run average (ERA) in  innings.  On August 19, 2022, the Rays promoted Herget to the major leagues, but he was designated for assignment and cleared waivers without appearing in a game. He was selected again to the major league roster on September 12, and made his major league debut the next day.  On September 22, Herget was designated for assignment and was sent outright to Triple-A. On October 3, Herget's contract was once again selected. He was designated for assignment the next day. On October 14, Herget elected to become a free agent.

Cincinnati Reds
On November 10, 2022, Herget signed a minor league contract with the Cincinnati Reds.

References

External links

1991 births
Living people
Tampa Bay Rays players
Charleston Dirty Birds players
Columbus Clippers players
Durham Bulls players
Gigantes de Carolina players
Memphis Redbirds players
Palm Beach Cardinals players
Peoria Chiefs players
Springfield Cardinals players
Fargo-Moorhead RedHawks players
Gulf Coast Cardinals players
Gigantes del Cibao players
American expatriate baseball players in the Dominican Republic
Kean Cougars baseball
Indios de Mayagüez players
State College Spikes players
Baseball players from New Jersey
Park Ridge High School alumni
People from Park Ridge, New Jersey
People from Teaneck, New Jersey
Sportspeople from Bergen County, New Jersey
Major League Baseball pitchers